Acacia imitans, also commonly known as Gibson wattle, is a shrub belonging to the genus Acacia and the subgenus Phyllodineae that is endemic to south western Australia. It is a declared endangered species under the West Australian and Australian Acts, and is on the IUCN Redlist.

Description
It has smooth, linear, glabrous grey branchlets. Like most species of Acacia it has phyllodes rather than true leaves. The small asymmetric phyllodes have a sharp upturned point. It blooms from August to September and produces yellow flowers. The simple inflorescences with obloid to shortly cylindrical flower-heads with bright yellow flowers.

Distribution
It is native to a very small area around Yalgoo in the Wheatbelt region of Western Australia where it is often situated on rocky hills and grows in rocky red loamy soils as a part of tall shrubland communities. The total population is estimated at around 550 mature plants.

Threats
It has an estimated area of occupancy of only 30 to 100 square kilometres, and is threatened by grazing from sheep and feral goats,  by inappropriate fire regimes, by possible mining, and by climate change.

See also
List of Acacia species

References

imitans
Acacias of Western Australia
Taxa named by Bruce Maslin
Plants described in 1999